James Tyrrell Reid (born 15 July 1994) is a professional footballer who plays as a forward for  club Stevenage.

Early life
Born in Torquay, Devon, Reid attended South Dartmoor Community College.

Club career

Exeter City
Reid graduated from the Exeter City youth team to turn professional in April 2012.

Reid made his debut for Exeter on 26 December 2012, receiving praise for his performance in a 3–1 defeat to Oxford United at St James Park.

Dorchester Town
He was loaned out to Conference South side Dorchester Town in July 2012.

Torquay United
On 18 February 2015, Jamie Reid completed a loan move to Torquay United.

Truro City
On 29 September 2015, Reid joined Truro City on a one-month loan. He made his debut just four days later, opening the scoring by lobbing the keeper from 20 yards out just 8 minutes into a 3–0 win over Havant & Waterlooville.

On 26 October, Steve Tully announced that Reid's loan had been extended by another month.

Torquay United
On 25 July 2016, Reid completed a three-month loan move to Torquay United. On 5 January 2017 Reid's loan was extended until the end of the 2016–17 season.

On 30 June 2017, he returned to Torquay United on a six-month loan deal.

On 20 October 2017, Reid signed an 18-month contract with Torquay United after spending 10 years at Exeter City, beginning in the youth system and earning a professional contract in May 2011. Season of 18/19 Reid went on to score 32 goals in a promotion season for Torquay, receiving the club's player of the year award and the golden boot, along with these the accolades kept coming with him being awarded the national leagues player of the year, top goal scorer and being in the end of season team of the year.

Mansfield Town

Reid joined League Two club Mansfield Town on a two-year contract on 23 June 2020. He scored his first goal for Mansfield on 10 November 2020 in an EFL Trophy group game against Scunthorpe United.

Stevenage
Reid signed for fellow League Two club Stevenage on 13 July 2021. Reid scored an 88th minute penalty to equalise the match in a third round FA Cup tie away at Premier League side Aston Villa as Stevenage prevailed 2–1 at Villa Park.

Career statistics

Honours
Torquay United
National League South: 2018–19

Individual
National League South Team of the Year: 2018–19
National League South Player of the Year: 2018–19

References

External links 

1994 births
Living people
English footballers
English people of Northern Ireland descent
Footballers from Devon
Association football forwards
Exeter City F.C. players
Dorchester Town F.C. players
Torquay United F.C. players
Mansfield Town F.C. players
Stevenage F.C. players
National League (English football) players
English Football League players
Northern Ireland under-21 international footballers
Sportspeople from Torquay